Edward Charles Elliott is the full name of:
 Edward C. Elliott (1874–1960), American educator
 Charlie Elliott (jockey) (1904–1979), British jockey

See also
Edward Elliott (disambiguation)